'State Elementary School Cipinang Melayu 11 Petang is an Indonesian public school in jalan Kartika Eka Paksi, RT.010 RW 06, KPAD Jatiwaringin, Kelurahan Cipinang Melayu, Kecamatan Makasar, Jakarta Timur, Jakarta, Indonesia.

History 
The school was founded in 1980 as public school by the DKI Jakarta government with an area of 6.800 m2 and started to be used in 1982/1983. The school identity is  : 10.13.16.40.81.03 and  : 100030

Another school within the area are: 
 State Elementary School Cipinang Melayu 04 Pagi
 State Elementary School Cipinang Melayu 03 Pagi
 State Elementary School Cipinang Melayu 12 Petang dan
 SMAN 81 Jakarta

External links

References

Schools in Indonesia
Schools in Jakarta